Brackiella is a genus of Gram-negative, oxidase- and catalase-positive, rod-shaped bacteria from the family of Alcaligenaceae with one known species (Brackiella oedipodis).

References

Burkholderiales
Monotypic bacteria genera
Bacteria genera